Air Marshal Sir Lawrence Fleming Pendred,  (5 May 1899 – 19 September 1986) was a Royal Air Force officer who became Air Officer Commanding-in-Chief of Flying Training Command from 1952 until his retirement in 1955.

RAF career
Educated at Epsom College, Pendred joined the Royal Naval Air Service in 1917 towards the end of the First World War and served as a pilot with No. 2 Squadron. He specialised in intelligence and in 1930 he joined the Intelligence Staff at Headquarters RAF Transjordan and Palestine. He served in the Second World War on the air staff in the Deputy Directorate of Operations (Home) and then in the Directorate of Plans. He continued his war service as Chief Intelligence Officer at Headquarters RAF Bomber Command from 1941, as Director of Intelligence at the Air Ministry from 1942 and as Chief Intelligence Officer at Headquarters Allied Expeditionary Air Force from 1944. He spent the closing years of the war as Assistant Commandant at the RAF Staff College, Bulstrode Park and then as Air Officer Commanding No. 227 Group.

After the war Pendred was appointed Director of Intelligence to Supreme Commander, South East Asia and then, from 1947, Assistant Chief of the Air Staff (Intelligence). He went on to be commandant at the School of Land/Air Warfare in 1950 and Air Officer Commanding-in-Chief of Flying Training Command in 1952, before retiring in 1955. Under Pendred the standard training sequence for new pilots was the Provost and then the Vampire aircraft types.

In retirement Pendred was President of the Old Epsomian Club.

References

|-

1899 births
1986 deaths
Companions of the Order of the Bath
Grand Crosses of the Order of Polonia Restituta
Heads of RAF Intelligence
Knights Commander of the Order of the British Empire
People educated at Epsom College
Recipients of the Distinguished Flying Cross (United Kingdom)
Royal Air Force air marshals
Royal Air Force personnel of World War II
Royal Naval Air Service aviators
Royal Naval Air Service personnel of World War I